Aghem (Wum or Yum) is a Grassfields Bantu language spoken in the Wum Central Sub-division in Menchum Division of the North West Region of Cameroon.

References

External links

Miscellaneous Links
 Aghem Bible translation Project
 Aghem language on AFADA USA website
Entries for Aghem in inventories of languages and people groups
 information about Aghem in Joshua Project 
 Aghem language entry in Glottolog
 Aghem language entry in the Ethnologue
 PeopleGroups entry for Aghem
 OLAC (Open Language Archives) resources in and about the Aghem language
Linguistic papers on the Aghem language
 Phonological Reconstruction and the Aghem Central Vowels, by David Thormoset
 Focus Marking in Aghem: Syntax or Semantics?, by Larry M. Hyman (April 27, 2006, Revised March 12, 2007)
 Focus in Aghem, by Larry M. Hyman and Maria Polinsky

Ring languages
Languages of Cameroon